Hunter Douglas N.V. is a Dutch multinational corporation. Its principal business is making window blinds and coverings. The company is publicly listed.

The head office is in Rotterdam, the Netherlands, and a management office in Lucerne, Switzerland.

Structure
The current corporate structure, Hunter Douglas N.V., was formed in the Netherlands Antilles in 1971 as a result of a restructuring of the previous Canadian entity, Hunter Douglas Ltd. For tax reasons, investors could select either common or preferred shares through 1990. The company operates in more than 100 countries.

In February 2022, former CEO Ralph Sonnenberg transferred a 75% interest to 3G Capital through a Block Trade, the Sonnenberg Family now owns 25% of Hunter Douglas Group.

Acquisitions 
In 2013, Hunter Douglas purchased a minority stake in 247 Home Furnishings Ltd (247), which they did not make known to the Competitions and Markets Authority (CMA). At a later date in 2016, Hunter Douglas purchased a majority share in Blinds2Go which is by far the largest UK retailer of made-to-measure blinds. Following that, Hunter Douglas made a second acquisition of Hillarys Blinds in 2017. At this point, Hunter Douglas already owned a significant share of the market before purchasing a majority stake of 51% for 247 in 2019. The initial purchase in 2013 had not been cleared with the CMA and the second purchase would have given Hunter Douglas 100% ownership of 247. As a result of concerns around competition in the market, Hunter Douglas was forced to sell their 51% purchase of shares from 2019. This sale was completed and approved by the CMA and went to Cristobal Consulting Ltd.

In March 2022, Hunter Douglas completed the acquisition of 74% of Droma-Sunshade Experts, an exterior sunscreen assembler, with a fast-growing sales presence in Western Europe.

References

External links

Window manufacturers
Manufacturing companies based in Rotterdam
Companies listed on Euronext Amsterdam
Dutch brands
2022 mergers and acquisitions